The Qatur (also transliterated as Ghotour) is a river in eastern Turkey and northwestern Iran. It is a right tributary of the river Aras. It rises in the Saray District of eastern Turkey, where it is also referred to as Çaybağı Çayı. The Ghotour Bridge, part of the Van–Sufian railway, crosses the river near the city Khoy.

The area has a cold semi-arid climate (Köppen climate classification BSk).

References

Rivers of Iran
Rivers of Turkey
Landforms of West Azerbaijan Province